Love at the Wheel is a 1921 German silent comedy film directed by Victor Janson and starring Ossi Oswalda, Janson and Rudolf Forster.

The film's sets were designed by the art directors Robert Neppach and Kurt Richter.

Cast

References

Bibliography

External links

1921 films
Films of the Weimar Republic
Films directed by Victor Janson
German silent feature films
1921 comedy films
German comedy films
UFA GmbH films
German black-and-white films
Silent comedy films
1920s German films